Shane Stone (born October 26, 1992) is an American politician who served in the Oklahoma House of Representatives for the 89th district from 2014 to 2019.

References

1992 births
Living people
Democratic Party members of the Oklahoma House of Representatives
21st-century American politicians